María Parrado (born 28 April 2001) is a Spanish singer. She is best known as the winner of the first season of The Voice Kids Spain in 2014. She has since released two albums and has been nominated for a 2017 Kids' Choice Award.

Biography 
At the age of eight she participated in the TV contest Cántame una canción (on the Spanish channel Telecinco).
After that she also was selected to perform on the TV show Menuda noche on Canal Sur.

She was part of Malú's team on the show.

The two songs that she sang on the final day of La Voz Kids ("Quién" by Pablo Alborán in the semifinal of nine competitors and "Lucía" by Joan Manuel Serrat in the final of three), were promptly released as singles and appeared on the Spanish national chart.

A few weeks later María Parrado released her debut album, produced by Universal Music Spain and titled simply María Parrado. It soon reached number 2 on the Spanish national album chart. The album spent 46 consecutive weeks on the chart.

Later in the year, she recorded songs for the Spanish-language version of the 2014 American musical film Annie. She performed Spanish versions of the songs sung by Quvenzhané Wallis (Annie) in the original English version. The movie was released to Spanish cinemas in January 2015.

In June 2015, she released her second album, titled April, 
which entered the Spanish national album chart at its peak position of number six and spent 17 consecutive weeks on the chart.

In 2016 she became a jury member on a new talent show titled Fenómeno Fan, broadcast on Canal Sur.

She also performed the Spanish version of the main theme of the Disney animated feature Moana that hit cinemas in Spain on 2 December 2016.

She has been nominated for a 2017 Kids' Choice Award for Best Spanish Music Act.

In 2018, she released her third album, titled Alas. It contained a song written by her.

Family 
Her mother, Mariló Ávila, is a psychologist.  Her father, Salvador Parrado Díaz, died suddenly on February 16, 2017, aged 45. Her paternal grandfather is in the construction materials business, his company is the official distributor of Porcelanosa and of all the major local construction companies.

Discography

Albums

Awards and nominations

References

External links 
 

The Voice Kids contestants
People from Cádiz
2001 births
Living people
21st-century Spanish singers
21st-century Spanish women singers